A series of six ICC World Cricket League (WCL) tournaments, as well as a series of pre-qualifying regional tournaments, and the 2009 Cricket World Cup Qualifier were played between January 2007 and April 2009. It was the first use of the World Cricket League structure. Through the WCL tournaments, teams could advance to the World Cup Qualifier, which could lead to qualification for the 2011 Cricket World Cup. 30 Associate and Affiliate members of the ICC participated in the events.

The Afghanistan national cricket team ascended from Division Five to Division One by winning three of these tournaments and performing well in the World Cup Qualifier.

Structure
The league structure was organised with the five global divisions. The regional tournaments were administered by the five Development Regions of the International Cricket Council: Africa, Americas, Asia, East Asia-Pacific, and Europe.

Summary
The following is the summary of World Cricket League and its structure. This was followed by the International Cricket Council.

The above diagram shows the chronological order and structure of the divisions within the World Cricket League. From left to right the chronology of the divisions is indicated; from top to bottom the hierarchy within the competition. The arrows indicate the number of teams promoted and relegated between leagues

Tournaments summary

Teams

References

 
World Cricket League